Willen is an unincorporated community in southwestern Manitoba, Canada. It is located approximately 41 kilometers (25 miles) northwest of Virden, Manitoba in the Rural Municipality of Ellice – Archie.

References 

Unincorporated communities in Manitoba